Don Vélez (18 January 1948 – 11 July 2010) was a Nicaraguan athlete. He competed at the 1968 Summer Olympics and the 1972 Summer Olympics. He won a silver medal in the javelin at the 1970 Central American and Caribbean Games.

References

1948 births
2010 deaths
Athletes (track and field) at the 1968 Summer Olympics
Athletes (track and field) at the 1972 Summer Olympics
Nicaraguan male long jumpers
Nicaraguan male javelin throwers
Nicaraguan decathletes
Olympic athletes of Nicaragua
Competitors at the 1970 Central American and Caribbean Games
Central American and Caribbean Games silver medalists for Nicaragua
Sportspeople from Managua
Central American and Caribbean Games medalists in athletics